ASC Guemeul is a Mauritanean football club based in Rosso the capital of the Trarza region.
The club plays in the Mauritanean Premier League.

Stadium
Currently the team plays at the 1000 capacity Stade Trarza.

References

External links
Soccerway

Football clubs in Mauritania